The 1965 Stanford Indians football team represented Stanford University in the 1965 NCAA University Division football season. The team was led by third-year head coach John Ralston and played their home games at Stanford Stadium in Stanford, California.

Stanford finished with a losing record within the AAWU conference, but were undefeated (4–0–1) outside the conference. They were led by defensive end Gary Pettigrew and fullback Ray Handley.

Schedule

Players drafted by the NFL/AFL

References

Stanford
Stanford Cardinal football seasons
Stanford Indians football